V2 is the second studio album by the punk band the Vibrators, released in 1978 on Epic Records. The album was dedicated to Wolf "Moishe" Moser.

Chart performance
It was their most successful album, reaching No. 33 in the UK Albums Chart.  The single "Automatic Lover", taken from the album, was the only Vibrators’ single to reach the UK Top 40 where it reached No. 33. It earned the band a TV appearance on the prime-time TV show Top of the Pops.

Reissues
Some of the songs from this album and the previous album Pure Mania were combined to form the American album Batteries Included, released by CBS Records in 1980. It was packaged together with Pure Mania by Track Records in 2002, and has recently been re-issued by Captain Oi! Records with bonus tracks "Judy Says (Knock You in the Head)" and "Pushing Too Hard".

Reception
"V2 shows the Vibrators  taking the driving energy of punk and applying it to songs that have a subtle, pop-like quality; while it does not have the wonderfully brash and itchy cohesiveness of Pure Mania, it's a solid album well worth hearing." (David Cleary, Allmusic) 
"V2 is a letdown, the energy dissipated with nothing but the cheap thrills of secondhand kinkiness to compensate." (Dave Marsh, Rolling Stone) 
"While some of the material is not that different from the debut LP, V2 is pretentious and overblown, following too many different cul-de-sacs to hang together." (Ira Robbins, Trouser Press) 

Scottish punk rock band The Exploited covered the track "Troops of Tomorrow" and used it as the title track for their second album.

Track listing
All songs written by Knox, except for where noted.

Side one
"Pure Mania"  3:00  
"Automatic Lover"  3:04  
"Flying Duck Theory"  (John Ellis) 2:58  
"Public Enemy No. 1" (Knox, Gary Tibbs) 2:07  
"Destroy"  (Knox, Tibbs) 2:16  
"Nazi Baby"  4:19

Side two
"Wake Up"  1:57  
"Sulphate"  1:43  
"24 Hour People"  2:52  
"Fall in Love"  4:31  
"Feel Alright"  1:51  
"War Zone"  2:17  
"Troops of Tomorrow"  5:39

"Pure Mania" includes an extract from "Red House" by Jimi Hendrix, and begins with the original sound of the German WWII flying-bomb, the V1 (the ‘V2', a ballistic missile, sound was never recorded) getting close, then the engine stops, some seconds of silence, then the explosion).

Personnel
The Vibrators 
Knox - guitar, piano, vocals
John Ellis - guitar, synthesizer, vocals, cover artwork
Gary Tibbs - bass, vocals
John "Eddie" Edwards - drums, vocals
with:
Sisters of No Mercy - choir on "Sulphate"
Berlin Symphonia - strings
Nicky Graham - string arrangements

References

External links
 V2 at Discogs

1978 albums
Punk rock albums by British artists
Albums produced by Vic Maile
Epic Records albums
The Vibrators albums